The Sisters Brothers is a 2018 Western film directed by Jacques Audiard from a screenplay he co-wrote with Thomas Bidegain, based on the novel of the same name by Patrick deWitt. An American and French co-production, it is Audiard's first English-language work. The film stars John C. Reilly (who also produced) and Joaquin Phoenix as the notorious assassin brothers Eli and Charlie Sisters, and follows the two brothers as they chase after two men (Jake Gyllenhaal and Riz Ahmed) who have banded together to search for gold.

The film had its world premiere at the Venice International Film Festival on 2 September 2018, where it won the Silver Lion for Best Direction, and was theatrically released in the United States on 21 September 2018. The Sisters Brothers received positive reviews from critics, with most praise going to its performances, characters, direction and soundtrack. It was a box office bomb, grossing $13.1 million against its $38 million production budget. It was the final feature film featuring Rutger Hauer released before his death, although he had finished filming several projects released after his passing.

Plot
In the American West in 1851, gunfighters Eli and Charlie Sisters are hired by the wealthy "Commodore" to kill a man named Hermann Warm.

John Morris, a private detective, has been hired by the Commodore to track Warm down and hand him over to the Sisters brothers. Morris finds Warm traveling by wagon train to California with the Gold Rush and befriends him. They travel to Jacksonville where Morris has arranged his rendezvous with the Sisters brothers. Warm finds Morris' handcuffs, realizes his true intentions, and threatens him at gunpoint but Morris overpowers him. Warm reveals that he plans to find gold using a chemical formula of his own invention; the Sisters brothers have been sent to retrieve the formula, most likely by torturing Warm before killing him. Refusing to allow an innocent man's murder, Morris frees Warm and the two leave Jacksonville. On the road toward San Francisco, Warm reveals that his ultimate plan is to create a utopian society in Dallas, Texas.

The brothers' pursuit is plagued by misfortune. A grizzly bear attacks their camp and mauls Eli's horse, Eli almost dies from a venomous spider bite and Charlie is repeatedly drunk and too hung over to ride. When they discover Morris' betrayal in Jacksonville, they follow the pair to Mayfield. At Ms. Mayfield's hotel and brothel, she denies having seen Warm and Morris but offers the brothers a warm welcome. A sympathetic prostitute warns Eli of an impending attack and he attempts to leave with a drunken Charlie but they are cornered by Mayfield's gunslingers. The brothers kill the gunslingers and interrogate Mayfield as to Warm's and Morris’ whereabouts, before murdering and robbing her.

In San Francisco, Charlie and Eli argue about continuing their hunt. Eli wishes to retire and open a store, but Charlie angrily rejects this idea. The next day, Charlie reveals that he has found a claim staked in Morris' name a few days' ride away. Eli agrees to complete the hunt as their final job.

On the way to the claim site, the brothers are ambushed and captured by Warm and Morris, who are then attacked by Mayfield's men sent before her death to claim the formula for herself. The four team up to kill Mayfield's men, after which Charlie and Eli agree to help Warm and Morris find gold in exchange for half the takings. Morris is revealed to be a wealthy young man from Washington DC, who came west in rebellion against his father, now dead, and to whom Warm's Dallas phalanstère project has at last given a purpose in life. Working to dam the river, the new partners develop a camaraderie. Eli reveals to Warm that Charlie killed their abusive, alcoholic father when they were young, and that Charlie's short temper and violent tendencies put him in danger, so Eli reluctantly took up their present employment to protect him.

The dam is completed and Warm explains that when his chemical formula is added to water, it causes gold ore to glow briefly, but is extremely caustic. The men pour the formula into the river and begin gathering the gold. When the glow begins to fade, Charlie panics and tries to add more formula, but spills the undiluted substance onto his hand and into the river. Morris, rushing to restrain Charlie, stumbles and is submerged in the contaminated water while Warm, ignoring Eli's warnings, jumps in to rescue him. The next day, Warm, blinded and badly burned, dies from his injuries while Morris shoots himself to end his suffering.

Eli takes Charlie to the nearest town, where a doctor amputates his arm. Hired guns sent by the Commodore arrive and demand their surrender. Eli shoots them and the brothers spend many days fighting against various hired guns until he and Charlie decide they must kill the Commodore. They arrive in Oregon City to find that he has already died. The brothers' are the only mourners at the Commodore's open casket; Eli punches the corpse several times "just to make sure". The brothers return home to their mother; though initially suspicious, she welcomes them in.

Cast
 John C. Reilly as Eli Sisters
Aldo Maland as Young Eli Sisters
 Joaquin Phoenix as Charlie Sisters
Theo Exarchopoulos as Young Charlie Sisters
 Jake Gyllenhaal as John Morris
 Riz Ahmed as Hermann Kermit Warm
 Rebecca Root as Mayfield
 Allison Tolman as Saloon Prostitute
 Rutger Hauer as The Commodore
 Carol Kane as Mrs. Sisters, The Brothers' Mother
 Ian Reddington as Mr. Sisters, The Brothers' Father
 Richard Brake as Rex
 Creed Bratton as Quarrel Saloon Patron #2

Production
In 2011, it was announced that the film rights to the novel The Sisters Brothers had been sold to John C. Reilly's production company, and Reilly was set to play one of the brothers. Four years later, French director Jacques Audiard announced on the radio station RTL that he would direct the film, his first English-language feature.  On 25 April 2016, Deadline Hollywood reported that Joaquin Phoenix had joined the project. In February 2017, Variety reported that Jake Gyllenhaal had also been cast, later announcing that Riz Ahmed joined as well. In May, Variety stated that Annapurna Pictures would also produce and co-finance the film, alongside Why Not Productions, with Megan Ellison serving as an executive producer on the project.

The film started shooting in early June 2017 in the Spanish city Almería, and continued the shoot throughout the summer in Tabernas, Navarre and Aragon.

Release
The Sisters Brothers had its world premiere at the Venice Film Festival on 2 September 2018. It was also screened at the Toronto International Film Festival on 7 September, and was theatrically released on 21 September 2018. Annapurna paid between $7.5–9 million for the North American distribution rights.

Reception

Box office
, The Sisters Brothers has grossed $3.1 million in the United States and Canada, and $10 million in other territories, for a total worldwide gross of $13.1 million, against a production budget of $38 million.

During its limited opening weekend, on 21 September, the film grossed $115,575 from four theaters, an average of $28,894 per venue. It expanded to 27 theaters in its second weekend, making $233,258, and to 54 theaters in its third, grossing $203,525. By its seventh weekend of release, the film had crossed $3 million domestically, after grossing $66,665 in 146 theaters that weekend. Its widest release was at 1,141 theaters.

Critical response
The site's critical consensus reads, "The Sisters Brothers rides familiar genre trails in occasionally unexpected ways - a satisfying journey further elevated by its well-matched leading men." On Metacritic, the film has a weighted average score of 78 out of 100, based on reviews from 44 critics, indicating "generally favorable reviews".

Peter Bradshaw of The Guardian gave the film 4 out of 5 stars, calling it "resoundingly enjoyable and funny". William Bibbiani of IGN assigned it an 8.0 out of 10, saying, "John C. Reilly and Joaquin Phoenix shine as wild west hitmen who are just smart enough to know they should be smarter, [and] whose quest leads them in unexpected, funny, and surprisingly emotional directions." Owen Gleibermen of Variety wrote, "The Sisters Brothers is too light to be a true drama and too heavy to be a comedy."

The film earned a warm response, including a standing ovation, at the 75th Venice International Film Festival. Jacques Audiard won the Silver Lion for Best Director at the festival.

Accolades

References

External links
 
 
 
 
 

2018 films
2018 Western (genre) films
American Western (genre) films
Annapurna Pictures films
UGC films
France 2 Cinéma films
France 3 Cinéma films
French Western (genre) films
Films directed by Jacques Audiard
2010s English-language films
English-language French films
English-language Spanish films
Films about contract killing
Films based on Canadian novels
Films produced by Michael De Luca
Films set in 1851
Films set in Oregon
Films set in San Francisco
Films shot in Spain
Films shot in Romania
Films with screenplays by Jacques Audiard
Films with screenplays by Thomas Bidegain
Films whose director won the Best Director César Award
Films based on works by Patrick deWitt
Films about brothers
2010s American films
2010s French films
Foreign films set in the United States